Ernesto Diaz may refer to: 

Ernesto Díaz, Colombian footballer
Ernesto Díaz Espinoza, Chilean writer, film director and editor
Ernesto Díaz González, Puerto Rican television sportscaster
A fictional character in the video game Time Crisis II